Stone County Courthouse is a historic courthouse located at Galena, Stone County, Missouri.  It was built in 1920, and is a three-story, Classical Revival style brick building on a concrete foundation. It features two colossal, modified Doric order columns on a recessed wall plane at the second and third stories. It cost $47,600 to complete.

It was listed on the National Register of Historic Places in 1980.

The courthouse is undergoing a $5 million, 14,000 square-foot expansion scheduled to be completed in summer 2019.

References

County courthouses in Missouri
Courthouses on the National Register of Historic Places in Missouri
Neoclassical architecture in Missouri
Government buildings completed in 1920
Buildings and structures in Stone County, Missouri
National Register of Historic Places in Stone County, Missouri